The 1977–78 Iowa State Cyclones men's basketball team represented Iowa State University during the 1977–78 NCAA Division I men's basketball season. The Cyclones were coached by Lynn Nance, who was in his second season with the Cyclones. They played their home games at Hilton Coliseum in Ames, Iowa.

They finished the season 14–13, 9–5 in Big Eight play to finish tied for second place. The Cyclones lost in the first round of the Big Eight tournament to seventh seeded Missouri, falling 65-63.

Roster

Schedule and results 

|-
!colspan=6 style=""|Exhibition

|-
!colspan=6 style=""|Regular Season

|-
!colspan=6 style=""|Big Eight tournament

|-

References 

Iowa State Cyclones men's basketball seasons
Iowa State
Iowa State Cyc
Iowa State Cyc